Evaristo San Cristóval (26 October 1848, Cerro de Pasco – 8 December 1900, Lima) was a Peruvian painter, illustrator, and engraver.

Life and work 
His father, Dionisio, was a member of the first Restorative Expedition during the War of the Confederation and, after its defeat, settled in the remote village of Cerro de Pasco, where he was employed in mining. 

He was already working as a draftsman and produced such high-quality work that found employment helping to build the Central Railway of Peru. During the War of the Pacific, he served as a Major in the general staff of the army reserves. 

Later, he taught himself lithography and, in 1887, set up his own workshop. His first commissions came from the Italian-born industrialist, Pedro Bacigalupi, who owned a printing press that was used to produce the magazine El Perú Ilustrado, which was launched the same year. His portrait engravings were considered the magazine's highlights. It was published until 1892.

He worked for several other publications as well; notably La Ilustración Americana (1890-1891), La Revista Americana (1891-1892), La Exposición de Lima (1892) and El Perú Artístico (1893-1894). He also served as the illustrator for some historical works; most famously, the Galería de los gobernadores y virreyes del Perú, by José Antonio de Lavalle, published in 1891, for which he produced a complete set of portraits depicting the Viceroys.

His portraits ran into the thousands; of prominent men and women. The exact number of his prints is unknown. He also did oil paintings, watercolors and portrait miniatures.

Sources
 Jorge Basadre Grohmann: Historia de la República del Perú (1822 - 1933), Vol.10, p. 292–293. Empresa Editora El Comercio S. A. Lima, 2005.   
 Alberto Tauro del Pino: Enciclopedia Ilustrada del Perú. Tercera Edición. Vol.15. Lima, PEISA, 2001.

External links

1848 births
1900 deaths
Peruvian artists
Peruvian illustrators
Lithographers
People from Pasco Region
19th-century engravers